Royal Bodyguard may refer to:
 Royal Bodyguard of Bhutan
 The Royal Bodyguard, British television series (2011)

See also
 Sovereign's Bodyguard